Monte Sano may refer to:

 Monte Sano Mountain, Monte Sano State Park, and Monte Sano Nature Preserve, all in Huntsville, Alabama, USA
 Monte Sano (6500 BCE), Early Archaic period mound complex in Baton Rouge, Louisiana
 Monte-Sano & Pruzan, an American fashion house founded by Vincent Monte-Sano senior, originally called Monte-Sano.